Fair Oaks, California may refer to:
Fair Oaks, California, in Sacramento County
Fair Oaks, Mendocino County, California
North Fair Oaks, California, in San Mateo County